Bill McCarthy was an Australian rugby league footballer who played in the 1900s and 1910s.  He played for North Sydney in the NSWRL competition and was a foundation player of the club.

Playing career
McCarthy played in North Sydney's first ever game against South Sydney on 20 April 1908 at Birchgrove Oval.  McCarthy finished as the club's top try scorer with 5 tries in their inaugural season.

McCarthy also represented both Metropolis and New South Wales in 1908.

McCarthy played with Norths up until the end of the 1910 season before retiring.

References

North Sydney Bears players
Rugby league players from Sydney
Rugby league wingers
Rugby league centres
Year of birth missing
Year of death missing
New South Wales rugby league team players